The Bangladesh Order of Precedence , officially known as Warrant of Precedence, is a symbolic hierarchy that  lays down the relative precedence in terms of ranks of important functionaries belonging to the executive, legislative and judicial organs of the state, including members of the foreign diplomatic corps. It is to be noted that the Warrant of Precedence was challenged by a writ petition. On November 10, 2016, the Appellate Division of the Bangladesh Supreme Court issued a full judgment on the writ of Warrant of Precedence. Though the Government has filed a review petition, the Appellate Division did not stay the execution of the judgment. Cabinet division has revised and published a new warrant of precedence in July 2020 which contradicts with the judgement of the Supreme Court on Warrant of Precedence. If any law or ordinance conflicts with the Constitution or the interpretation of the Constitution given by the Supreme Court, the Constitution or the interpretation of the Constitution by the Supreme Court shall prevail.

Order

Key Aspects 
 The order in this warrant of Precedence is meant for state and ceremonial occasions.
 The entries in the above table, which are in alphabetical order on each article, apply exclusively to the persons mentioned in the table of precedence and, while regulating their relative precedence with each other do not give them any precedence over members of the non-official community in Bangladesh, not mentioned in the table who shall take their place according to usage.
 Persons in the above table will take precedence in order of the number of the entries. Those included in the same number will take precedence inter se according to the date of entry into that number. When two or more persons enter an article on the same date, their inter se seniority will be fixed in the basis of length of class I service, in case of officers, and in the case on an elected office bearer given precedence over permanent Government servants entering the article on the same date. Amongst elected office-bearers entering article on the same date precedence will be accorded by alphabetical order of the surname. Officers of the Defense Services, in the same article will rank inter se according to their relative service seniority.
 When a person holds more than one position in the table, he will be entitled to the highest position accorded to him.
 Officers who are temporarily officiating in any number of the table he will take precedence in that number below permanent incumbents.
 All officers not mentioned in the above table, whose rank is regulated by comparison with rank in the Army will have the same precedence with reference to Civil Servant as is enjoyed by military officers of equivalent grades (see table of equivalent ranks given under note 9 below).
 Married ladies, unless by virtue of holding an appointment themselves they are entitled to a higher position in the table, shall take place according to the precedence herein assigned to their respective husbands.
 All other persons not mentioned in the above table will take precedence according to general usage, which is to be explained and determined by the President in case any question shall arise.

References 

 

Bangladesh
Government of Bangladesh